Skipton Girls' High School, founded in 1886 by the Petyt Trust, is an all-girls selective grammar school situated in Skipton, North Yorkshire, England. The school is a founding member of Northern Star Academies Trust and leads Northern Lights Teaching School Alliance and Northern Lights SCITT. Around 810 girls aged 11 to 18 are educated at the school, of which 240 are in the sixth form.

Status
The school was awarded specialist status as an Engineering College in September 2003, becoming the first all-girls school to achieve this status. It also has Investors in People accreditation and Fair Trade FairAchiever status. On 1 April 2011, the school became an academy and on 1 April 2015, the school established the Multi-Academy Trust Northern Star Academies Trust.

Admission
As an academy Trust the Governors are responsible for admissions. Girls who wish to join the school sit a selection test. There is no selection test for entrance into sixth form as pupils are admitted on the basis of their GCSE grades. Pupils joining the sixth form are expected to have achieved 5 A*-C inc English and Maths and at least a grade B at GCSE in the subjects they want to study at A-level.

Ofsted inspections
Before the school's conversion to academy status in 2011, it underwent an Ofsted inspection, in 2008, followed by an interim assessment in March 2011.  In the 2008 inspection the school was rated Grade 1 (outstanding) for overall effectiveness, in all separate areas of assessment, and throughout all pupil years.

Old Girls' Guild
The Old Girls' Guild was started on 24 November 1917. The Guild still meets twice each year, for the Spring Reunion and Autumn Luncheon. The idea of the guild developed during Miss Larner's years as Headmistress during which staff and former pupils would meet. Miss Broadbent continued this, organising social events. The Guild's first magazine was published in 1918 and with the exception of 1920 one has been published every year.  Bound copies of the magazine are held at Skipton Reference Library.

Houses
Every girl from Year 7 to Year 13 is in one of the four houses, each of which has a house colour. Each house is named after a woman or women of note from history: Bronte (red) is named after the Brontë sisters, Curie (yellow) after Marie Curie, Franklin (blue) after Rosalind Franklin and Johnson (green) after Amy Johnson.

The original four houses of Skipton Girls' High School were Clifford (yellow), de Romille (red), Norton (blue) and Pembroke (green). These were names that linked the school to the Craven area - Clifford, de Romille and Pembroke all being related to Skipton Castle. Later, three houses taking the names of former headteachers (Broadbent, Larner and Wise) were used.

Sixth form
Sixth form results typically put the school in the top 100 state schools in the country for A-Level results. In 2015 the pass rate was over 99%, with 74% of entries reaching either A* A or B grade.  A significant number of pupils go on to Oxford, Cambridge and the Russell Group Universities each year.

The school teaches twenty-two A- and AS-Level courses – including some shared with Ermysted's Grammar School sixth form – and the AQA Baccalaureate. The Baccalaureate requires a pupil to gain at least 3 A-Levels in any combination of subjects, while undertaking an extended project (EPQ) and 100 hours of activity over the two years of the course. This covers three areas: Community Service, Personal Development and Work-Based Learning.

Notable former pupils

 Claire Brooks (1931–2008) – Lib Dem politician
 Elizabeth Harwood (1938–1990) – opera singer
 Ruzwana Bashir – first British Asian woman to become President of the Oxford Union
 Katherine Langrish – fantasy writer

See also
 Ermysted's Grammar School
 Harrogate High School - joint founder of Northern Star Academies Trust

References

External links
 Official site
 EduBase

Grammar schools in North Yorkshire
Skipton
Girls' schools in North Yorkshire
Educational institutions established in 1886
Fair trade schools
1886 establishments in England
Academies in North Yorkshire

Specialist engineering colleges in England